Doctor Aybolit (Doktor Aibolit) is a fictional character from the children's poems Aybolit (1929) and Barmaley (1925) by Korney Chukovsky, as well as from the children's fantastic novella Doctor Aybolit (1925) by the same author. The name may be translated as "Ouch, [it] hurts!"

The origins of Aybolit can be traced to Hugh Lofting's 1920 character Doctor Dolittle. Like Buratino by Aleksey Tolstoy or The Wizard of the Emerald City by Alexander Volkov, Doctor Aybolit stems from a loose adaptation by a Russian author of a foreign book. For example, the adaptation includes a Pushmi-pullyu,  (tyani-tolkay) in Russian. The prose adaptation always credited Lofting in the subtitle, while the Aybolit poems are original works.

The character became a recognizable feature of Russian culture. The poems found their following in the films Doktor Aybolit (black and white, 1938), Aybolit 66 (Mosfilm, 1967, English title: Oh How It Hurts 66), and Doctor Aybolit (animated film, Kievnauchfilm, 1985). The doctor's appearance and name appear in brand names, logos, and slogans of various medical establishments, candies, etc.

Aybolit's antagonist, the evil pirate Barmaley, became an archetypal villain in Russian culture. Barmaley debuted in Chukovsky's book Barmaley in 1925, 13 years before the first film appearance of Aybolit.

The poems Aybolit and Barmaley generated a number of Russian catchphrases such as "Nu spasibo tebe, Aybolit!" (Thanks to you, Aybolit), "Ne hodite, deti, v Afriku gulyat" (Children, don't go to Africa for a stroll). They were also the inspiration for the Barmaley Fountain in Stalingrad.

In 1967 Richard N. Coe published a loose English adaptation in verse entitled Doctor Concocter. It starts: "Doctor Concocter sits under a tree, He's ever so clever, he has a degree!"

A living prototype of the character was Chukovsky's acquaintance, the Vilnian Jewish doctor Zemach Shabad (1864–1935), to whom a monument was dedicated in Vilnius on 16 May 2007. In Lithuanian language, Doctor Aybolit is called Daktaras Aiskauda.

References

Bibliography
 
 
 
 
 
 
 . Extracts of Aybolit and Barmaley.

Fictional physicians
Characters in children's literature
Works by Korney Chukovsky
Russian poems
Children's poetry
Characters in poems
Literary characters introduced in 1929
1929 poems
1929 in Russia
Russian children's literature
Children's novellas
Fictional Soviet people
Fictional Russian people in literature
Male characters in literature